Irfan Handžić (born 1 October 1956) is a retired Bosnian professional football goalkeeper and manager.

Playing career

Club
He spent the majority of his playing career with Sarajevo, before transferring to the Turkish Süper Lig.

Managerial career
As a manager, he worked in Turkey, Kuwait and his native Bosnia. He was most recently the goalkeeping coach of Sarajevo.

References

1956 births
Living people
Footballers from Sarajevo
Bosniaks of Bosnia and Herzegovina
Association football goalkeepers
Yugoslav footballers
FK Sarajevo players
Mersin İdman Yurdu footballers
Adana Demirspor footballers
Yugoslav First League players
TFF First League players
Süper Lig players
Yugoslav expatriate footballers
Expatriate footballers in Turkey
Yugoslav expatriate sportspeople in Turkey
Bosnia and Herzegovina football managers
NK Čelik Zenica managers
Premier League of Bosnia and Herzegovina managers
Bosnia and Herzegovina expatriate football managers
Expatriate football managers in Turkey
Bosnia and Herzegovina expatriate sportspeople in Turkey
Expatriate football managers in Kuwait
Association football goalkeeping coaches
Bosnia and Herzegovina expatriate sportspeople in Kuwait